Kakwa Pass, is a mountain pass in the Canadian Rockies. It is located in the province of British Columbia on the Continental Divide.  It is located just east of McGregor Pass and to the north of the town of McBride.

It is the prominence col for Wishaw Mountain, which has 1063 m prominence and is located just south.

See also 
Kakwa Provincial Park
Kakwa River
South Kakwa Pass
List of mountain passes

References 

Canadian Rockies
Mountain passes of British Columbia
Great Divide of North America
Borders of Alberta
Borders of British Columbia